The Jubilee Recreation Centre is a 1,586-seat multi-purpose arena in Fort Saskatchewan, Alberta.  It was home to the Fort Saskatchewan Traders ice hockey team.  The arena is also referred to as "the JRC".

Now only little league hockey, the CJHL Pyramid Corporation Hawks and Fort Chiefs senior men's AAA hockey is played at the location. The city's lacrosse team called The Fort Saskatchewan Rebels play here as well.

The town has two other arenas, one located in the Dow Centennial Centre, the other located in the arena called the Sportsplex.

References

Indoor arenas in Alberta
Indoor ice hockey venues in Canada
Fort Saskatchewan